The Floridan Palace Hotel, formerly known as the Hotel Floridan or Floridan Hotel, is a historic hotel in Tampa, Florida, United States. It is located at 905 North Florida Avenue in the north end of the downtown core.  It was designed by prominent Tampa architects G.A. Miller and Francis J. Kennard and built in 1926, opening in early 1927. On March 12, 1996, the Floridan was added to the U.S. National Register of Historic Places.

History
Construction on the hotel began in 1926 by Francis J. Kennard & Son, Architects and the Floridan Hotel officially opened in 1927 with 19 floors and 316 rooms, at a cost of $1.9 million to build.  At the time the Floridan was the tallest building in Tampa and would remain the tallest building in until 1966 when the Franklin Exchange Building was completed.

The hotel's bar, the Sapphire Room, was a popular nightspot during World War II for servicemen who were training at nearby Drew Field to fly B-17s over Europe.  Many of the service men at that time were housed in makeshift barracks located underneath the bleachers at the old Florida State Fairgrounds racetrack a few blocks away.  The bar's wild reputation at the time earned it the nickname "The Surefire Room".

The hotel began to decline in patronage in the early 1960s as more modern "motels" were built along the highways that skirted the city.  In 1966, the hotel closed to commercial and tourist guests and remained open to long term renters only.  By the 1980s, the once grand and luxurious hotel had become a residence for transients renting rooms by the week or month. The Floridan Hotel finally closed its doors in 1989 after the new ownership failed to bring the building up to new firecodes. After seven years of restoration, the hotel opened again to the public on July 30, 2012, as the Floridan Palace Hotel.

Restoration

The hotel had bounced through several ownership groups from 1987 until 2005.  Most prominent among these was Akio Ogawa and Sity International Inc. who purchased the Hotel at foreclosure in 1989.  This purchase is noteworthy because it was the work of Ogawa that had the building added to the National Register of Historic Places on March 12, 1996.  He would sell the hotel in 1997 to Capital LLC.

The Hotel was purchased in April 2005 by hotelier and real-estate investor Tony Markopoulos for $6 million.  An extensive cleaning and restoration of the building's interior and exterior began in August 2005 and ended July 2012. A grand opening ceremony was held on July 28 of that year and opened to the public on July 30.

The Floridan's original sign, which was found in a rooftop storage room during the cleaning of the building in 2005, and had adorned the buildings roof for decades, was restored and placed on the hotel's rooftop once more in late summer 2008.

Features

The current hotel maintains many original features of the hotel. The hotel had 400 small rooms during the 1940s. The rooms were expanded during the renovations into 213 larger rooms including 15 suites and 3 penthouse suites.

The famous Crystal Dining Room has been restored and expanded across the west side of the lobby, connecting into the lobby bar, which was originally a ladies' lounge. The Dining Room, in addition to featuring traditional continental cuisine, also includes a wide selection of Mediterranean dishes, in homage to the hotel's Greek owner.

The Sapphire Lounge on the first floor has likewise been restored, and a ballroom, housed in the former post office immediately adjacent to the Floridan, has been added, with plans to add a pool and spa in the future.

See also

References

External links

 Official Floridan Palace website
 Hillsborough County listings at National Register of Historic Places
 Florida's Office of Cultural and Historical Programs
 Hillsborough County listings
 Floridan Hotel
 Brad Massey, "The Rise, Fall and Rebirth of a Modern Florida Landmark: A History of Tampa's Floridan Hotel," Tampa Bay History, Volume 23, 2009: pgs. 1-29

Skyscraper hotels in Tampa, Florida
National Register of Historic Places in Tampa, Florida
Hotel buildings completed in 1927
1927 establishments in Florida
Skyscraper hotels in Florida